The Smith's Prize was the name of each of two prizes awarded annually to two research students in mathematics and theoretical physics at the University of Cambridge from 1769. Following the reorganization in 1998, they are now awarded under the names Smith-Knight Prize and Rayleigh-Knight Prize.

History

The Smith Prize fund was founded by bequest of Robert Smith upon his death in 1768, having by his will left £3,500 of South Sea Company stock to the University. Every year two or more junior Bachelor of Arts students who had made the greatest progress in mathematics and natural philosophy were to be awarded a prize from the fund. The prize was awarded every year from 1769 to 1998 except 1917.

From 1769 to 1885, the prize was awarded for the best performance in a series of examinations. In 1854 George Stokes included an examination question on a particular theorem that William Thomson had written to him about, which is now known as Stokes' theorem. T. W. Körner notes
Only a small number of students took the Smith's prize examination in the nineteenth century. When Karl Pearson took the examination in 1879, the examiners were Stokes, Maxwell, Cayley, and Todhunter and the examinees went on each occasion to an examiner's dwelling, did a morning paper, had lunch there and continued their work on the paper in the afternoon.

In 1885, the examination was renamed Part III, (now known as the Master of Advanced Study in Mathematics for students who studied outside of Cambridge before taking it) and the prize was awarded for the best submitted essay rather than examination performance. According to Barrow-Green
By fostering an interest in the study of applied mathematics, the competition contributed towards the success in mathematical physics that was to become the hallmark of Cambridge mathematics during the second half of the nineteenth century.

In the twentieth century, the competition stimulated postgraduate research in mathematics in Cambridge and the competition has played a significant role by providing a springboard for graduates considering an academic career. The majority of prize-winners have gone on to become professional mathematicians or physicists.

The Rayleigh Prize was an additional prize, which was awarded for the first time in 1911.

The Smith's and Rayleigh prizes were only available to Cambridge graduate students who had been undergraduates at Cambridge. The J.T. Knight Prize was established in 1974 for Cambridge graduates who had been undergraduates at other universities. The prize commemorates J.T. Knight (1942–1970), who had been an undergraduate student at Glasgow and a graduate student at Cambridge. He was killed in a motor car accident in Ireland in April 1970.

Value of the prizes
Originally, in 1769, the prizes were worth £25 each and remained at that level for 100 years. In 1867, they fell to £23 and in 1915 were still reported to be worth that amount. By 1930, the value had risen to about £30, and by 1940, the value had risen by a further one pound to £31. By 1998, a Smith's Prize was worth around £250.

In 2007, the value of the three prize funds was roughly £175,000.

Reorganization of prizes
In 1998 the Smith Prize, Rayleigh Prize and J. T. Knight Prize were replaced by the Smith-Knight Prize and Rayleigh-Knight Prize, the standard for the former being higher than that required for the latter.

Smith's Prize recipients
For the period up to 1940 a complete list is given in  including titles of prize essays from 1889 to 1940. The following includes a selection from this list.

Awarded for examination performance

Awarded for essay

Rayleigh Prize recipients
A more complete list of Rayleigh prize recipients is given in Appendix 1 ("List of Prize Winners and their Essays 1885-1940") of
 1913 Ralph H. Fowler
 1923 Edward Collingwood
 1927 William McCrea
 1930 Harold Davenport
 1937 David Stanley Evans
 1951 Gabriel Andrew Dirac
 1980 David Benson
 1982 Susan Stepney
 1994 Group 4: J.D. King, A.P. Martin. Group 5: K.M. Croudace, J.R. Elliot.
 1998 P. Bolchover, O. T. Johnson, R. W. Verrill, R. Bhattacharyya, U. A. Salam, S. A. Wright and T. J. Hunt

J. T. Knight Prize recipients
 1974 Cameron Leigh Stewart Allan J. Clarke
 1975 Frank Kelly and Ian Sobey
 1976 Trevor McDougall 
 1977 Gerard Murphy
 1981 Bruce Allen and Philip K. Pollett
 1983 Ya-xiang Yuan
 1985 Reinhard Diestel
 1987 Qin Sheng (mathematician)
 1988 Somak Raychaudhury
 1990 Darryn W. Waugh
 1991 Renzo L. Ricca
 1992 Grant Lythe, Christophe Pichon, Henrik O. Rasmussen
 1993 Anastasios Christou Petkou
 1994 Group 1: M. Gaberdiel, Y. Liu. Group 3: H.A. Chamblin. Group 4: P.P. Avelino, S.G. Lack, A.L. Sydenham. Group 5: S. Keras, U. Meyer, G.M. Pritchard, H. Ramanathan, K. Strobl. Group 6: A.O. Bender, V. Toledano Laredo.
 1996 Conor Houghton, Thomas Manke
 1997 Arno Schindlmayr
 1998 A. Bejancu, G. M. Keith, J. Sawon, D. R. Brecher, T. S. H. Leinster, S. Slijepcevic, K. K. Damodaran, A. R. Mohebalhojeh, C. T. Snydal, F. De Rooij, O. Pikhurko, David K. H. Tan, P. R. Hiemer, T. Prestidge, F. Wagner, Viet Ha Hoàng, A. W. Rempel and Jium-Huei Proty Wu

Smith–Knight Prize recipients
 1999 D. W. Essex, H. S. Reall, A. Saikia, A. C. Faul, Duncan C. Richer, M. J. Vartiainen, T. A. Fisher, J. Rosenzweig, J. Wierzba and J. B. Gutowski
 2001 B. J. Green, T A. Mennim, A. Mijatovic, F. A. Dolan, Paul D. Metcalfe and S. R. Tod
 2002 Konstantin Ardakov, Edward Crane and Simon Wadsley
 2004 Neil Roxburgh
 2005 David Conlon
 2008 Miguel Paulos
 2009 Olga Goulko
 2010 Miguel Custódio
 2011 Ioan Manolescu
 2014 Bhargav P. Narayanan
 2018 Theodor Bjorkmo, Muntazir Abidi, Amelia Drew, Leong Khim Wong
 2020 Jef Laga, Kasia Warburton, Daniel Zhang, Shayan Iranipour
2021 David Gwilym Baker, Hannah Banks, Jason Joykutty, Andreas Schachner, Mohammed Rifath Khan Shafi

Rayleigh–Knight Prize recipients
 1999 C. D. Bloor, R. Oeckl, J. Y. Whiston, Y-C. Chen, P. L. Rendon, C. Wunderer, J. H. P. Dawes, D. M. Rodgers, H-M. Gutmann and A. N. Ross
 2001 A. F. R. Bain, S. Khan, S. Schafer-Nameki, N. R. Farr, J. Niesen, J. H. Siggers, M. Fayers, D. Oriti, M. J. Tildesley, J. R. Gair, M. R. E. H. Pickles, A. J. Tolley, S. R. Hodges, R. Portugues, C. Voll, M. Kampp, P. J. P. Roche and B. M. J. B. Walker
 2004 Oliver Rinne
 2005 Guillaume Pierre Bascoul and Giuseppe Di Graziano
 2007 Anders Hansen and Vladimir Lazić

See also

 List of mathematics awards

References

Mathematics education in the United Kingdom
Mathematical awards and prizes of the University of Cambridge
1768 establishments in England